Juana María de la Concepción Méndez Guzmán, commonly referred as Conny Méndez (11 April 1898 – 26 November 1979) was a Venezuelan composer, singer, writer, caricaturist, actress and metaphysicist. Her parents were the poet Eugenio Mendez y Mendoza and Lastenia Guzman. Her schooling was in Caracas and New York City. In New York, Mendez studied paint in the Art Student's and music in the New School of Music. During the 1920s she returned to Caracas, and collaborated as a writer and caricaturist in different magazines and newspapers, including El Nuevo Diario, Elite and Nosotras. These cartoons were collected in the work Bistury: Album de caricaturas (1931). In 1946 Mendez founded the Christian Metaphysics movement in Venezuela, under the influence of Count Saint-Germain, the European occultist. During the first years of the 1950s, she worked as an actress in "Camas separadas" of Terence Rattingam, directed by Horacio Peterson at the Caracas Theater Club. In 1955, she published her autobiography titled "Memorias de una loca" (Memories of a crazy woman) and in 1967 her book "Del guayuco al quepis". However, it was in the field of composition and musical interpretation, where she did her more fruitful work. Her folk and popular music included more than 40 compositions, like "Chucho y Ceferina" (A couple of natives), "La Negrita Marisol" (A creole girl), "Venezuela Habla Cantando" (Venezuela speaks like singing), and many others. She inspired Chabuca Granda, a Peruvian composer, with its songs dedicated to her country and to nature when at that time, in Peru, " people mainly sang to broken hearts” she says. These are songs that never go out of fashion. The miracle of the popular song is that different countries perform it in their own way.” The last years of her life were exclusively dedicated to the study of Christian metaphysics. In 1977 she published a series of works about this topic, among them: "Metafisica al alcance de todos" (Metaphysics for Everyone) (1977) and "Misterios develados" (Unveiled Mysteries) (1979) and "El librito azul" (The blue booklet).She was born in Caracas and died in Miami, Florida, United States.

Family
Joseph Rincones (ex-husband)

Donald Rincones (son)

Alexandra Rincones (granddaughter)

Daniel Rincones (grandson)

Antonieta Rincones (great-granddaughter)

Bibliography
Metafísica al Alcance de Todos (English title: Metaphysics for Everyone)
Te Regalo lo que Se Te Antoje
El Maravilloso Número 7
¿Quién es y Quién Fue el Conde de Saint Germain?
Piensa Lo Bueno y Se Te Dará
Metafísica 4 en 1 (English title: Power through Metaphysics)
El Nuevo Pensamiento
¿Qué es la Metafísica?
El Librito Azul
Un Tesoro Más para Ti
La Voz del "Yo Soy"
La Carrera de Un Átomo
Numerologìa 22

See also
Venezuela
Venezuelan music
Metaphysics
Rubén Cedeño

References

External links
 Metafísica by Conny Méndez
 AudioBooks by Fonolibro
 Conny Méndez's Biography in YouTube.com
 Conny Méndez
 Page of the movement she founded (Metafísica Renovada Ray Sol)
 In the memory of Conny Méndez

1898 births
1979 deaths
Venezuelan composers
20th-century Venezuelan women singers
Venezuelan folk singers
Venezuelan women writers
Singers from Caracas
20th-century women composers
Venezuelan emigrants to the United States